A mountain river is a river that runs usually in mountains.

Mountain River may also refer to:
 Mountain River (Northwest Territories), a stream in Canada
 Mountain River, Tasmania, a settlement in Australia 
 Mountain River (album), by Dou Wei